Édith Butler  (born Marie Nicole Butler, 27 July 1942) is an Acadian-Canadian singer-songwriter and folklorist of from New Brunswick’s Acadian Peninsula.

Biography
Édith Butler was born in Paquetville on the Acadian Peninsula in Gloucester County, New Brunswick. During the 1960s she obtained a Bachelor of Arts, taught school, and then earned a Master’s degree in literature and traditional ethnography at Laval University in 1969.

Career in music
Her career began in the early 1960s with performances in Moncton. In 1969, she released her debut album, "Chansons d’Acadie," of traditional Acadian songs. This was followed by national appearances on CBC Television's Singalong Jubilee where she gained popularity and began to receive invitations to participate in various Canadian and American folk festivals.

In the early 1970's she represented Canada at the Universal Exposition in Osaka and performed in over 500 performances across Japan. Following this, she made several musical tours in Europe, notably in Ireland, Germany and the United States.

In total, Butler released 28 albums between 1969 and 2021. As of 2019 when she was inducted into the Canadian Songwriters Hall of Fame, Édith Butler had one gold and two platinum records.

Career in theater

Butler also performed in a piece by Antonine Maillet entitled "Le tintamarre".

Honours
Butler was appointed an Officer of the Order of Canada in June 1975.
She was one of the four musicians pictured on the second series of the Canadian Recording Artist Series issued by Canada Post stamps on 2 July 2009.
In 2009, she received the Governor General's Performing Arts Award for Lifetime Artistic Achievement, Canada's highest honour in the performing arts.
In 2010, Butler was the recipient of the Lifetime Achievement Award at the 2010 French SOCAN Awards in Montreal. 
In 2012 she received the Lieutenant-Governor's Award for High Achievement in the Arts for Performing Arts.
In 2013, she was made a member of the Order of New Brunswick
In 2019, Édith Butler was inducted into the Canadian Songwriters Hall of Fame

References

External links
 Short documentary Edith Butler
 Édith Butler official website
The Canadian Encyclopedia: Édith Butler
Jam: Édith Butler
 Quebec Info Musique: Édith Butler
Édith Butler, Singer – Cover story, Atlantic Insight Magazine – December 1979

1942 births
Living people
Canadian women folk singers
Officers of the Order of Canada
Governor General's Performing Arts Award winners
Members of the Order of New Brunswick
Musicians from New Brunswick
Acadian people
People from Gloucester County, New Brunswick
Canadian folk singers
French-language singers of Canada
20th-century Canadian women singers
21st-century Canadian women singers
Canadian Folk Music Award winners
Université Laval alumni